Evelyn County is one of the 141 Cadastral divisions of New South Wales, Australia.

Evelyn County is named in honour of Police Magistrate Evelyn Pitfield Shirley Sturt (1816–1885) who was the brother of Charles Sturt.

Parishes within this county
A full list of parishes found within this county; their current LGA and mapping coordinates to the approximate centre of each location is as follows:

References

Counties of New South Wales